HOn30 (also called HOn2½, HO9 and H0e) gauge is the modelling of narrow-gauge railways in HO on N gauge track in 1:87 scale ratio.

Definitions 
The term HOn30 (and sometimes HOn2½) is generally used when modelling American prototypes while H0e is used for European prototypes.  In the Britain the term OO9 is sometimes used. All these terms refer to models of narrow-gauge railways built to the world's most popular model railway scale of HO (1:87) but using a track gauge of —the gauge used for N scale models of standard-gauge railways.  OO9 refers to OO scale, 1:76.2, models on 9mm gauge track.  Although the track gauge is 9mm, sometimes N scale track per se is not used because the ties or sleepers are out of scale and too close together.  HOn30 track is available.

HOn30 

HOn30 is often used to model the  gauge railroads in the US state of Maine. The first HOn30 / HOn2½ ready-to-run (RTR) brand introduced in the US was the AHM MinitrainS, initially manufactured by Egger-Bahn and later by Roco and Mehanoteknika Izola, also known as Mehano.

Perhaps the most fascinating part of HOn30 is that RTR models are still scarce. One exception is The MinitrainS line that has recently been upgraded.

H0e 

H0e is a gauge defined by the Normen Europäischer Modellbahnen (NEM). But this is very close to the gauge of the  gauge railways most widely used in Germany,  gauge railways Bosnian gauge most widely used in the former Austro-Hungarian empire,  gauge rack railways in Switzerland as well as to the  gauge used in parts of the British Empire.

Development 

H0e scale was invented by Egger-Bahn in 1963 - for a long time out of production, but some of the Egger-Bahn line has been reintroduced by MinitrainS.
Other manufacturers to produce HOe in recent years have included Roco, Liliput, Bemo and Tillig.

United States 
In 1965 Bob Hayden and Dave Frary stumbled upon an Associated Hobby Manufacturer's AHM "MinitrainS" HOn2½ (now named HOn30) train set at a Woolworth's department store and decided to use it to model Maine 2-foot railroads in HO scale.

The AHM MinitrainS line was introduced only a few years after N scale appeared in Europe. The product line represented North American prototypes in HO scale, using N gauge track. AHM offered two industrial locomotives, a Plymouth diesel and a Baldwin steam locomotive.

Hayden & Frary used the AHM trains to model a HOn2½ 3' x 5' portable model railroad called the Elk River Line. The layout appeared in articles starting in the April 1970 issue of Railroad Model Craftsman.

The pair built a second HOn2½ layout called Thatcher's Inlet, a 6’ x 30" shelf-type switching layout. It was inspired by the Wiscasset waterfront of the Maine 2-foot railroads. The equipment was based more on available N gauge products than on the AHM MinitrainS line - it reflected the growing variety of N gauge equipment and accessories available in the early 1970s.

Next came Dave Frary's 12' x 26' HOn2½ Carrabasset & Dead River Ry (C&DR), one of the first known large model railroad to utilize HOn2½. It appeared in the Nov 1979 and Feb 1980 issues of Model Railroader.

In 1974, Bob hayden started his own version of the C&DR. Its first engine was a reworked AHM MinitrainS steamer. The first C&DR road diesels, No. 25 and 26, were based on Minitrix N gauge Fairbanks-Morse switchers. Bob's C&DR was featured in MR’s Great Model Railroads 1991 annual.

During the mid-1970s a Japanese company, Sango, made a kit for a 2-6-0 Baldwin engine which showed a great improvement in running ability. This started a growing interest in HOn2½ in Japan.  From 1978 to 1982, Joe Works, Sango, and Flying Zoo kits and built-up brass models came on the scene.  There was a thriving interest in Japan in 2-footers using N gauge track, as this allowed more HO scale modeling in less space than traditional HO gauge track.

Related scales 
The other NEM defined narrow gauges for H0 scale are H0m gauge (using  gauge originally TT scale track) for models of  gauge and similar prototypes and H0i or H0f gauge (using Z scale  track) for prototypes around  – the most popular gauge for industrial (or Feldbahn) railways.

In the United Kingdom where the most popular railway modelling scale is 1:76 designated 4 mm scale. The narrow-gauge equivalents to H0e and H0m are OO9 and OO12. For modelling  gauge railways – widely used in Ireland and the Isle of Man – a  gauge track (as for H0m) is used.

In the United States the NMRA have developed many standards for narrow-gauge modelling, including those modelling in HOn30 and its related gauges.

Summary

Table 
The following table lists the most popular narrow gauges in HO and OO scale:

Remarks 
Model railroaders with layouts and rolling stocks by American standard and usually by British standard use for designation of the scale in English language publications the letter O and not the number 0.

In Great Britain and rarely in the French language for narrow gauge it is written after designation of the scale the model gauge in mm, for example, OO9 or OO6.5 in United Kingdom and H09 rather than H0e or H06,5 rather than H0f in France.

In Great Britain and in the French language it is written sometimes with a hyphen or en dash between the scale and the model gauge, for example, OO–9 or H0-9.

See also 
 OO9 gauge narrow gauge railways in OO scale on N gauge track in 1:76 scale ratio
 List of narrow-gauge model railway scales

References

Model railroad scales
30 inch railways and modelling
Narrow gauge railway modelling